The men's road time trial competition of the cycling events at the 2019 Pan American Games was held on August 7 at the Circuito San Miguel.

Schedule

Results
20 riders from 14 countries was started

References

Cycling at the 2019 Pan American Games
Road cycling at the Pan American Games